Ali Bar (also Romanized as ‘Ālī Bar and ‘Ālībar; also known as Alīvar, Milla Aliwar, and Milleh Aliwar) is a village in Mahidasht Rural District, Mahidasht District, Kermanshah County, Kermanshah Province, Iran. At the 2006 census, its population was 38, in 11 families.

References 

Populated places in Kermanshah County